The Pentapartito (from Greek , "five", and Italian , "party"), commonly shortened to CAF (from the initials of Craxi, Andreotti and Forlani), refers to the coalition government of five Italian political parties that formed between June 1981 and April 1991. The pro-European and Atlanticist coalition comprised the Christian Democracy (DC), the Italian Socialist Party (PSI), Italian Democratic Socialist Party (PSDI), Italian Liberal Party (PLI), and Italian Republican Party (PRI).

History

New majority

The Pentapartito began in 1981 at a meeting of the Congress of the Italian Socialist Party (PSI) when the Christian Democrat Arnaldo Forlani and Socialist Secretary Bettino Craxi signed an agreement with the blessing of Giulio Andreotti. As the agreement was signed in a trailer, it was called the "pact of the camper." The pact was also called "CAF" for the initials of the signers, Craxi-Andreotti-Forlani. With this agreement, the DC party recognized the equal dignity of the so-called "secular parties" of the majority (i.e., the Socialists, Social Democrats, Liberals and Republicans) and also guaranteed an alternation of government (in fact, Giovanni Spadolini of the PRI and Bettino Craxi of the PSI became the first non-Christian Democrats to hold the premiership). With the birth of the Pentapartito, the possibility of the growth of the majority toward the Italian Communist Party (PCI) was finally dismissed. The Christian Democrats remained the leaders of the coalition, and managed several times to prevent representatives of the secular parties from becoming Prime Minister (Ciriaco De Mita was opposed, for example, by a continuous veto against Craxi).

Other sources, however, claim that the "pact of the camper" was only stipulated between Craxi, Forlani and Andreotti in 1989, in a parking lot of Ansaldo in Milan, where the Congress of the Italian Socialist Party took place. The pact would have provided a path that would have started with the fall of the De Mita's government and the formation of a cabinet with a social democrat-led transition, culminating in another Craxi's government, when it would release the armchair del Quirinale where the investiture is scheduled or of Andreotti and Forlani. Eugenio Scalfari in July 1989 will define "an agreement of a regime."

Quadripartito and Tangentopoli

The coalition ended in 1991 when the PRI withdrew its support from the coalition over its failure to be given the Ministry of Communications. On 29 March 1991, the 5-party Andreotti VI cabinet was replaced with the 4-party (quadripartito) Andreotti VII cabinet (lasting until 24 April 1992). This ruling coalition belongs to the twilight period of the so-called first Republic in Italy, the season ended with the mani pulite investigation conducted by the Prosecutor's Office in Milan, involving numerous politicians and almost all the national leaders of the parties that made up the pentapartito: Giulio Andreotti (DC), Arnaldo Forlani (DC), Ciriaco De Mita (DC), Paolo Cirino Pomicino (DC), Bettino Craxi (PSI), Renato Altissimo (PLI), Francesco De Lorenzo (PLI), Giorgio La Malfa (PRI) and many others, with the notable exception of Giovanni Spadolini, which never had charges against him.

This phase of Italian democracy is known as Tangentopoli. After the 1992 Italian general election, the quadripartito remained in power under the Amato Cabinet, although Prime Minister Giuliano Amato resigned on 28 April 1993 and subsequently, President of the Republic Oscar Luigi Scalfaro appointed the Governor of the Bank of Italy Carlo Azeglio Ciampi, new Prime Minister with the mandate to deal with the serious economic crisis and rewrite the electoral law. An electoral law was passed in predominantly majority either way for the Chamber and the Senate. They returned to the polls in 1994 in order to locate the repositioning of the parties in the light of new electoral legislation (which was still applied only in 1996 and, for the last time, in 2001).

Successor parties
The unofficial successor of the Pentapartito was the Pact for Italy, the centrist coalition led of Mariotto Segni and Patto Segni, the Italian People's Party of Mino Martinazzoli, inheritors of the DC, the PRI of Giorgio La Malfa, and the Liberal Democratic Union (Unione Liberaldemocratica) of Valerio Zanone. In the 1994 Italian general election, the PPI reached 11.07%, the Segni Pact (with PRI and FdL, the successor of PLI) reached 4.68%, the PSI reached 2.19%, and the PSDI reached 0.46%.

Ideology

The Pentapartito was a collection of parties from the centre and center-left, which opposed to both the Italian Communist Party on the left and the Italian Social Movement on the right. Despite having the character of a secular coalition and far more tending to the left, the alliance underwent conservative influences both from some small groups of the Christian Democracy and from the Italian Liberal Party. The PSI had strong social democratic, Keynesian, and liberal socialist majority groups; some factions had less libertarian ideas on issues such as drugs (the war on drugs of Craxi).

Internationally, the Pentapartito relied on a strong pro-Europeanism and Atlanticism from a pro-Arab policy (Craxi and Andreotti). This fact caused many frictions between the Liberals and the Socialists, and was one of the causes of disintegration of the coalition.

Composition

1981–1991 (Pentapartito)

1991–1993 (Quadripartito)

Electoral results
While for European elections each party stood individually, in general elections the Pentapartito coalition emerged and in various electoral debates the Pentapartito parties did not attack each other (maintaining between them a form of neutrality), concentrating their hostility against the PCI, MSI and other minor parties. The coalition governed Italy with a strong electoral majority from 1980 to 1991, the year of the Republican Party defection from the coalition.

This defection with the rise of Lega Nord and the disaffection towards Christian Democracy led to a sharp decline of the Pentapartito's electoral pool. In the 1992 Italian general election, the coalition lost its absolute electoral majority in both houses of parliament, losing over 3 million votes, however majoritarian distortions hidden in the proportional electoral system (as the remainders counting in electoral constituencies), permitted the coalition to achieve narrow majorities in both Chamber (majority of 16 seats) and Senate (majority of only 5 seats; 8, considering senators for life Taviani, Andreotti from DC and De Martino from PSI). The chaos provoked during the 1992 Italian presidential election, the weak leadership of socialist Prime Minister Giuliano Amato, the eruption of Tangentopoli with many ministers and majority MPs investigated or arrested, and the new electoral law, nicknamed Mattarellum (from its author Sergio Mattarella, the future President of Italy), led to the removal of almost all party oligarchies (from both majority and opposition, with the exceptions of the Democratic Party of the Left, MSI, Lega Nord and other regional parties), the subsequent dissolution of all the parties of Pentapartito and to a snap election after two years in March 1994.

Italian Parliament

References

External links
The Pentapartito at the University of Salford Institutional Repository

Defunct political party alliances in Italy
Giulio Andreotti